Ectoedemia lacrimulae is a moth of the family Nepticulidae. It is only known from the western part of the Kopet Dag ridge in Turkmenistan.

The length of the forewings is 3.6-3.8 mm for males and down to 3.2 mm for females. Adults are on wing from May to June.

External links
"Five New Mining Lepidoptera (Nepticulidae, Bucculatricidae) from Central Asia"

Nepticulidae
Moths of Asia
Moths described in 1996